Liggins is a surname. Notable people with this surname include:
 DeAndre Liggins (born 1988), American basketball player 
 Ethel Liggins (1886-1970), British pianist, also known by her stage name Ethel Leginska
 Frederick Liggins (1873-1926), New Zealand cricketer
 Graham Liggins (1926-2010), New Zealand medical scientist
 Granville Liggins (born 1946), American American football player
 Jamalcolm Liggins (born 1996), American football player
 Jimmy Liggins (1918-1983), American R&B guitarist 
 Joe Liggins (1916-1987), American R&B, jazz and blues pianist
 John Liggins (1829-1912), English episcopalian missionary
 John Liggins (1906-1976), English footballer
 Callum Liggins (2002-2022),Cardiff City Youth Academy Under 15/16 , Under 15 Welsh International